Christopher Cokinos is an American poet and writer of nonfiction on nature and the environment.

Born in 1963 in Indianapolis, Indiana, he studied at Indiana University at Bloomington (BA 1981) and at Washington University in St. Louis (MFA 1991). He taught at Kansas State University from 1991 to 2002. He also served as president of the Kansas Audubon Council from 1996 to 1998. In May 2011 he left Utah State University, where he taught for nine years and founded and edited Isotope: A Journal of Literary Nature and Science Writing. He is now an associate professor in the MFA program at the University of Arizona and is a member of the Institute of the Environment.

In 2003, he was one of 10 national recipients of the  Whiting Award, given annually to emerging writers of exceptional talent and promise.  He is also the winner of the Sigurd Olson Nature Writing Award, the Fine-Line Prize for Lyric Prose (from Mid-American Review), and the Glasgow Prize for an Emerging Writing of Nonfiction.

Cokinos is the winner of fellowships and grants from the American Antiquarian Society, the Utah Arts Council, and the National Science Foundation. In 2003–2004 he was a member of the Antarctic Search for Meteorites expedition for five weeks, as part of his research for The Fallen Sky: An Intimate History of Shooting Stars.

His essays, poems and reviews have appeared in the New York Times, the Los Angeles Times, the Iowa Review, Shenandoah, High Country News, Ecotone, Orion, Poetry, Western Humanities Review, and Science, among many other venues.

Cokinos lives with his partner, the writer Kathe Lison.

Bibliography

Non fiction
 Hope Is the Thing with Feathers: A Personal Chronicle of Vanished Birds, nonfiction (New York: Tarcher, 2000; Warner, 2001; Tarcher/Penguin, 2009, revised.)
 The Fallen Sky: An Intimate History of Shooting Stars, (New York: Tarcher/Penguin, 2009).
 Bodies, of the Holocene: Essays, (Truman State University Press, 2013).

Poetry collections
 Killing Seasons , (Topeka: Woodley Press, 1993)

References

Sources
Contemporary Authors Online. The Gale Group, 2007. PEN (Permanent Entry Number): 0000134622.

External links
 Isotope magazine website, archived
 "Christopher Cokinos" author website
Profile at The Whiting Foundation
 "Prozac for the Planet: Can geoengineering make the climate happy? by Christopher Cokinos, American Scholar, Autumn 2010

1963 births
Living people
Indiana University Bloomington alumni
Washington University in St. Louis alumni
University of Arizona faculty
Sky & Telescope people